Ochridaspongia is genus of freshwater sponges containing two species:
Ochridaspongia rotunda
Ochridaspongia interlithonis

These species are endemic and live only in Lake Ohrid. Ochridaspongia rotunda is found mostly at depths of 30–50 m and water temperatures of 6–8 °C. Its circular shape indicates the animal lives under conditions of relatively calm water.

References

Haplosclerida
Sponge genera
Endemic fauna of the Balkans